7 Nights is the fifth mixtape by British rap duo Krept and Konan. It is part of a dual-release alongside 7 Days, released on 20 October 2017 by Virgin EMI. The mixtape includes guest appearances from Tory Lanez, Jhené Aiko and Hudson East. It was supported by the lead single "For Me".

Singles
The lead single "For Me" was released on 29 September 2017 for streaming and digital download. It peaked at number 66 on the UK Singles Chart.

Track listing

Charts

References

2017 mixtape albums
Krept and Konan albums